Mitchell Crosswell (born 14 November 1988 in Feilding, New Zealand) is a New Zealand rugby union player. He plays in the flanker (and occasionally number eight) position for the provincial based ITM Cup side Taranaki.

Playing career
Crosswell made his provincial debut for Manawatu in 2008, he was a part of the Turbos squad up until 2011. He then went on to play a season for the Hino Red Dolphins in the Japanese competition. He then returned to New Zealand to play for provincial union, Taranaki, in the opening game of the 2013 ITM Cup.

References

External links
 itsrugby.co.uk profile

Living people
New Zealand rugby union players
1988 births
Manawatu rugby union players
Taranaki rugby union players
Chiefs (rugby union) players
Māori All Blacks players
New Zealand expatriate rugby union players
New Zealand expatriate sportspeople in Japan
Expatriate rugby union players in Japan
Rugby union flankers
Rugby union number eights
Rugby union players from Manawatū-Whanganui